The Richmond Ballet, named the State Ballet of Virginia in 1990 by then Governor Douglas Wilder, is an education and performance institution, founded in 1957.

Founding 

In 1957, the Ballet Impromptu, founded by Richmond natives Robert C. Watkins Jr. and Marjorie Fay Underhill and Donna Comstock Forrest, became Richmond's first ballet company. Later, the Ballet Impromptu became the Richmond Ballet. The Richmond Ballet existed for more than twenty years as a small, civic company until 1975, when the School of Richmond Ballet was created. In 1980, Stoner Winslett became the founding artistic director. In 1984, Richmond Ballet became the first professional Ballet company in Virginia and was designated the State Ballet of Virginia in 1990, by then Governor Wilder. Richmond Ballet's educational outreach program, Minds In Motion, was founded in 1993. It features a pedestrian based movement curriculum that is taught to 4th graders all over the commonwealth. In 2000, Richmond Ballet moved into a renovated facility in Richmond.

Performances 

In his 2011 article on American productions of Tchaikovsky's The Nutcracker, the New York Times' Alastair Macaulay singled out the Richmond Ballet production as one of the best in the country.
The company debuted in New York City in 2005 with performances at the Joyce Theater.
In October 2013, during the company's 30th season, the ballet premiered the contemporary work "Phoenix Rising", choreographed by Philip Neal, a former student of the Richmond Ballet school and dancer for 23 years with the New York City Ballet. Richmond Ballet returned to The Joyce Theater in April 2007 as part of a tribute to American master choreographer John Butler, and again in 2010. In 2012 Richmond Ballet made its international debut when they traveled to London where they performed in the Linbury Theatre at the Royal Opera House. In 2015 Richmond Ballet embarked on a tour of China. While in China they performed at the "Meet in Beijing" Arts Festival at the National Centre for the Performing Arts. They also performed in the cities of Jinan, Dezhou and Shanghai.

Commissioned works

Richmond Ballet has commissioned many ballets, including

...as an old shirt	                                Todd Rosenlieb		2008,
Always, at the Edge of Never            		Colin Connor	        2010,
Ancient Airs & Dances	                                Stoner Winslett	        1986,
Astormix	Philip Neal	2001,
Attention, Please	                                Val Caniparoli		1999,
At the Edge of Thira	                                Chris Burnside	        1997,
Avalon 	                                                Stoner Winslett	        1995,	
Between the Lines	                                Alan Hineline           2004,
Bouncing Light 	                                        Vladimir Angelov	2002,
Bow Out	Val                                             Caniparoli		1995,
Chasing Cello	                                        William Soleau	        2013,
Cinderella	                                        Malcolm Burn		2000,	
City Life 	                                        Mark Annear	        2016,
Closing Doors 	                                        William Soleau 	        2002,
Complete Trust	                                        Malcolm Burn 	        1997,
Dark Hugs Me Hard 	                                Susan Shields 	        2006,
Djangology	                                        Val Caniparoli 	        1997,
Echoing Past (Das alte Jahr) 	                        Stoner Winslett	        1996,
Ershter Vals 	                                        Ma Cong	                2009/10,
Estampie	                                        Miriam Mahdaviani	1995,
Faces 		                                        Malcolm Burn  	        2003,
Gargoyles 	                                        Philip Neal 	        2012,
The Howling Cat (Imaginary Tango)                	Kirk Peterson 	        2001,
Hymn 		                                        William Soleau 	        1990,
Inconsequentials 	                                Agnes de Mille 	        1981,
Into The Air 		                                Colin Connor 		2005,
iNVERSION 		                                Darrell Moultrie 	2014,
La Belle Danse 	                                 	Jessica Lang		2007,
Lift The Fallen		                                Ma Cong	        	2014,
Lines Squared		                                Jessica Lang		2009,
Luminitza		                                Ma Cong		        2012,
A Maiden's Hymn		                                Jessica Lang		2003,
Mephisto Walz		                                Philip Neal		2002,
Misa Criolla		                                William Soleau		2008,
Now and Then		                                Mauricio Wainrot	1999,
Nuevo Tango		                                William Soleau		1998,
The Nutcracker 		                                Stoner Winslett 	1984,
Octavo		                                        Gina Patterson		2011,
Orchestra		                                Stoner Winslett		1985,
Other Places		                                Stoner Winslett		1990,
Phoenix Rising		                                Philip Neal		2013,
Realms of Amber		                                Edgar Zendejas		2016,
Setting Sun		                                Chris Burnside		1994,
Silence		                                        Gina Patterson		2008/09,
Solace		                                        Philip Neal		2002,
Sojourn		                                        Stoner Winslett		1988,
Stolen Moments		                                Val Caniparoli		2015,
Streets & Legends		                        Colin Connor		1997,
String Sketches		                                William Soleau		1996,
Surfside		                                Michael John Lowe	2002,
Swipe		                                        Val Caniparoli		2011,
Tandem Spaces		                                William Soleau		1994,
Terra		                                        Colin Connor		1996,
To Familiar Spaces in Dream	                      	Jessica Lang		2005,
A Tribute (To Marcel Marceau & Bip)	         	Malcolm Burn		2008/11,
Triumph of Spring		                        Stoner Winslett		1988,
Vestiges		                                Colin Conor		2000,	
Ciolin		                                        Val Caniparoli		2006,
Vortex		                                        Kirk Peterson		1999,
Voyages		                                        Mauricio Wainrot        2008

New Work Festival Pieces

All Something and Light		                        Julie Job-Smithson      2009,
Chance Favors the Prepared Mind	                	Todd Rosenlieb		2008,
Diversions		                                James Frazier 		2009,
Dominant Curves		                                Sasha Janes		2013,
The Edge Of Place	                         	Amy Seiwert		2013,
Eos Chasma		                                Melissa Barak		2014,
Exulto			                                Peter Quanz		2014,
From My Life		                                Nicole Haskins		2015,
Inventory 		                                Matthew Frain		2015,
Lenton Rose 		                                Rex Wheeler		2015,
Morning Overtures	                        Patti D’Beck & David Leong	2008,
Ninfee		                                        Jacqulyn Buglisi	2009,
Polaris		                                        Katarzyna Skarpetowska	2015,
Reiffe		                                        Edgar Zendejas		2014,
Saideira		                                Darrell Moultrie	2013,
Shadows On The Inside		                        Gavin Stewart		2014,
Touched		                                        Viktor Plotnikov	2008,
Vanish			                                Starrene Foster		2013,
Y Por Ti                                	Eloy Barragan 		2008

School of Richmond Ballet

The School of Richmond Ballet was founded in 1975. The professional company of the Richmond Ballet was formed in 1984.

References 

Ballet companies in the United States
Dance in Virginia
Non-profit organizations based in Richmond, Virginia